Eilean a' Cheò is one of the twenty-one wards used to elect members of the Highland Council.  It includes the islands of Skye and Raasay. It elects four Councillors.

It is the only Highland Council ward with an official name in the Scottish Gaelic language. Eilean a' Cheò is a name for the Isle of Skye, meaning the Island of Mist.

Councillors

Election Results

2022 Election
2022 Highland Council election

2020 By-election

2017 Election
2017 Highland Council election

2012 Election
2012 Highland Council election

2007 Election
2007 Highland Council election

References

Highland council wards
Isle of Skye